The Municipality of North Norfolk is a rural municipality (RM) in the Canadian province of Manitoba.

History

It was incorporated on January 1, 2015 via the amalgamation of the RM of North Norfolk and the Town of MacGregor. It was formed as a requirement of The Municipal Amalgamations Act, which required that municipalities with a population less than 1,000 amalgamate with one or more neighbouring municipalities by 2015. The Government of Manitoba initiated these amalgamations in order for municipalities to meet the 1997 minimum population requirement of 1,000 to incorporate a municipality.

Communities
 Arizona
 Austin
 Bagot
 MacGregor
 Sidney

Demographics 

References 

2015 establishments in Manitoba
Manitoba municipal amalgamations, 2015
Populated places established in 2015
Rural municipalities in Manitoba